Jelovo Brdo is a village in the municipality of Kalesija, Bosnia and Herzegovina.

Demographics 
According to the 2013 census, its population was 489.

References

Populated places in Kalesija